Stadion Maguwoharjo is a football stadium in Sleman Regency, Special Region of Yogyakarta, Indonesia. It is the home of PSS Sleman. The stadium has capacity of 50,000 and it is located precisely 9 kilometers away from the Adisucipto International Airport.

History

Maguwoharjo Stadium was built in 2005 until 2007. It was owned by the Government of Sleman. It is mostly used for football matches and it is the home of Liga 1 club PSS Sleman.

International match

Indonesia League  Selection

2022 AFF U-16 Youth Championship

Notes

References

See also 
 PSS Sleman
 List of stadiums in Indonesia

Sports venues in Special Region of Yogyakarta
Multi-purpose stadiums in Special Region of Yogyakarta
Football venues in Special Region of Yogyakarta
PSS Sleman
Buildings and structures in the Special Region of Yogyakarta
Sports venues completed in 2007